Susan Marian Oosthuizen  (born 1953) is Emeritus Professor of Medieval Archaeology at the University of Cambridge. She specialises in examining the origins and development of early medieval and medieval landscapes, and in the evolution of systems of governance.

Career
Oosthuizen completed her undergraduate studies at the University of Southampton, her Master's degree at SOAS, University of London, and her PhD at Trinity Hall, Cambridge. She also holds a PGCE from the University of Cambridge.

Elected to an Emeritus Fellowship of Wolfson College, Cambridge from January 2019, she was previously a Governing Body Fellow of the College from 2002 to 2018. Within the University of Cambridge, she was associated with the Institute of Continuing Education, the Department of Archaeology and the Faculty of History.

She holds a National Award for History Teaching in Higher Education, awarded by LTSN for History, Archaeology and Classics, The Historical Association, History at the Universities Defence Group, and The Royal Historical Society. She is also a Fellow of the Higher Education Academy. She was elected as a Fellow of the Society of Antiquaries of London (FSA) on 7 June 2007, and a Fellow of the Royal Historical Society (FRHistS) in 2015.

Select publications

Oosthuizen, S. 2019.  The Emergence of the English. Arc-Humanities Press, York. 
Oosthuizen, S. 2017. The Anglo-Saxon Fenland. Oxbow, Oxford. 
Oosthuizen, S. 2016. 'Beyond Hierarchy: Archaeology, common rights and social identity'. World Archaeology 48 (3). 381–394. 
Oosthuizen, S. 2016. 'Culture and Identity in the Early Medieval Fenland Landscape'. Landscape History 37(1). 5–24. 
Oosthuizen, S. 2016. 'Review article: Recognising and Moving on from a Failed Paradigm: The case of agricultural landscapes in Anglo-Saxon England c.400–800'. Journal of Archaeological Research 24(2). 179–227. 
Oosthuizen, S. 2013. 'Beyond Hierarchy: The archaeology of collective governance'. World Archaeology 45(5). 714–729.

References

Fellows of the Society of Antiquaries of London
Living people
British women archaeologists
Medieval archaeologists
Alumni of Trinity Hall, Cambridge
Fellows of Wolfson College, Cambridge
British women historians
Year of birth missing (living people)
Landscape historians
1953 births